Águas may refer to:

Places
 Dos Aguas, a municipality in the Valencian Community, Spain
Aguas, municipality in Aragon, Spain
 Palace of the Marqués de Dos Aguas, a Rococo palace in Valencia, Spain

People
People with this surname include:
 José Águas (1930-2000), Angolan-Portuguese footballer
 Rui Águas (footballer) (born 1960), Angolan-Portuguese footballer, son of the above
 Raul Águas (born 1949), Angolan-Portuguese footballer, nephew of José, cousin of Rui
 Rui Águas (racing driver) (born 1972), Mozambican-Portuguese racecar driver

Portuguese-language surnames